Bucklerheads is a village in Angus, Scotland. It lies approximately three miles north of Monifieth, on the B978 road.

References

Villages in Angus, Scotland